Aadhityan is a 1993 Tamil-language drama film directed by V. L. Bashkaraaj. The film stars R. Sarathkumar and Sukanya. It was released on 14 January 1993.

Plot 

Aadhityan (R. Sarathkumar) is an orphan village blacksmith, and the villagers consider him as a rude ruffian. The neighboring Zamindar (Kitty) forces the villagers to leave the village, and they land in Aadhityan's village. Aadhityan helps them and then clashes with Zamindar. In the meantime, Chinna Pandi (Pandiarajan), a Tamil teacher, is engaged to teach Tamil to the Telugu girl Manga (Silk Smitha). Zamindar finally accepts the villagers in his village. Vedachellam (Delhi Ganesh) is a gambling addict who borrows money from Zamindar. Zamindar wants to get his son Vinod married to Vedachellam's daughter Rasathi (Sukanya). Under debts, Vedachellam accepts reluctantly Zamindar's proposal. Chinna Pandi advises Vedachellam to save the village and to get Aadhityan married to Rasathi. The drunk Aadhityan ties the thaali around Rasathi's neck. Now, Rasathi is married to Aadhityan, but she hates him.

Cast 

R. Sarathkumar as Aadhityan
Sukanya as Rasathi
Pandiarajan as Chinna Pandi
Silk Smitha as Manga
Anju
Kitty as Zamindar
Delhi Ganesh as Vedachellam
Shanmugasundaram as Pannayar
Chinni Jayanth
Kumarimuthu as Nallakannu
Master Haja Sheriff as Vellai
MLA Thangaraj as Pottu Gounder
M. N. Rajam
Sulakshana
Kamala Kamesh
Kokila as Kannamma
Thadchayini
Vinod as Vinod
R. E. Rajan
Meghu — Loghu

Soundtrack 

The film score and the soundtrack were composed by Gangai Amaran. The soundtrack, released in 1993, features 5 tracks with lyrics written by Gangai Amaran.

Reception 
K. Vijiyan of New Straits Times said, "if more care had been taken with the acting, it would have been remarkable". The Indian Express called it "yet another film that spins a puerile yarn and expects the audience to lap it up, insulting their intelligence in the bargain".

References 

1993 films
Indian action drama films
1990s Tamil-language films
Films scored by Gangai Amaran
1993 directorial debut films
1993 action drama films